Evermore Park is a fantasy adventure theme park in Pleasant Grove, Utah. Opened on September 29, 2018, guests visiting the park interact with trained actors who portray fantasy characters. The only traditional ride is "The Evermore Express", a small train that travels around the park. Evermore has been compared to the fictional Westworld, renaissance fairs and Choose Your Own Adventure books.

History
Evermore Park was founded by Ken Bretschneider, the founder of DigiCert. According to Bretschneider, the idea for Evermore partially arose from his tradition of elaborately decorating his home in Lindon, Utah for Halloween each year. The concept for Evermore Park was debuted at Salt Lake ComicCon in 2014, with the park announced to be opened the next year. Imagineer Josh Shipley left Disney to become CCO of Evermore in 2017. The park had its soft opening on September 20, 2018, while its grand opening was on September 29, 2018. The park has experienced financial difficulties, with some buildings and areas of the park having remained unfinished since its opening. By June 2020, several lawsuits had been filed against Evermore by contractors who had not been paid in full for the construction of the park's buildings. In 2021, many of the park's actors were laid off, and the land and buildings of the park were sold to Brandon Fugal, the chairman of Colliers International, reportedly allowing the park to break even.

One of the attraction ideas Bretschneider and visual effects artist Curtis Hickman had envisioned for the project, which would combine virtual reality with a physical environment, was spun off from Evermore into a separate business known as The Void, which also faced difficulty due to the COVID-19 pandemic.

Features
Evermore does not have traditional rides. Instead, most of the guest experience revolves around interaction with actors in the park's fantasy setting, where guests are encouraged to roleplay for themselves and take part in the park's storyline. Visitors in the park are referred to as "World Walkers", and are permitted to come in costume. Guests are able to join one of the park's guilds by completing tasks given to them by characters.

The park also offers archery, axe throwing, and a themed train experience. Vander's Keep, a themed building attached to the park, was formerly a restaurant and bar but has since been repurposed as an events venue.

The park is seasonal and only open on weekends. The first seasonal experience is called Lore, a Halloween-themed storyline during the fall. During the day, there is the Magical World of Lore, a family-friendly Halloween experience; at night, the park becomes the Cursed World of Lore, a haunted attraction. The second seasonal experience is Aurora, a winter world loosely inspired by the works of Charles Dickens. The final seasonal experience is Mythos, lasting from spring into summer.

Taylor Swift litigation 
Evermore became entangled in legal proceedings with American singer-songwriter Taylor Swift. In February 2021, Evermore Park filed a lawsuit against Swift over the name of her 2020 album Evermore alleging trademark infringement. Later that month, TAS Rights Management countersued the park on behalf of Swift, claiming that the park was playing Swift's songs "Love Story", "You Belong with Me" and "Bad Blood" without proper licensing. In March, both parties agreed to drop their lawsuits.

See also
Westworld
Renaissance fair

References

External links

Tripadvisor: Evermore Park

2018 establishments in Utah
Amusement parks opened in 2018
Amusement parks in Utah
Buildings and structures in Pleasant Grove, Utah